The Wellington boot was originally a type of  leather boot adapted from Hessian boots, a style of military riding boot. They were worn and popularised by Arthur Wellesley, 1st Duke of Wellington. The "Wellington" boot became a staple of practical foot wear for the British aristocracy and middle class in the early 19th century. The name was subsequently given to waterproof boots made of rubber and they are no longer associated with a particular class. They are now commonly used for a range of agricultural and outdoors pursuits.

Design and use

Wellington boots in contemporary usage are waterproof and are most often made from rubber or polyvinyl chloride (PVC), a halogenated polymer. They are usually worn when walking on wet or muddy ground, or to protect the wearer from heavy showers and puddles. They are generally just below knee-high although shorter boots are available. 
  
The "Wellington" is a common and necessary safety or hygiene shoe in diverse industrial settings: for heavy industry with an integrated reinforced toe; protection from mud and grime in mines, from chemical spills in chemical plants and from water, dirt, and mud in horticultural and agricultural work; and serving the high standard of hygiene required in food processing plants, operating theatres, and dust-free clean rooms for electronics manufacture.

Sailing wear includes short and tall sailing wellingtons with non-marking, slip-resistant soles to avoid damage to a boat's deck. These boots require thermal socks to be worn underneath as the rubber does not provide enough warmth.

History

Origins

The Duke of Wellington instructed his shoemaker, Hoby of St. James's Street, London, to modify the 18th-century Hessian boot. The resulting new boot was fabricated in soft calfskin leather, had the trim removed and was cut to fit more closely around the leg. The heels were low cut, stacked around an inch (2.5 centimetres), and the boot stopped at mid-calf. It was suitably hard-wearing for riding, yet smart enough for informal evening wear. The boot was dubbed the Wellington and the name has stuck in English ever since. In the 1815 portrait by James Lonsdale, the Duke can be seen wearing the more formal Hessian style boots, which are tasselled.

Wellington's utilitarian new boots quickly caught on with patriotic British gentlemen eager to emulate their war hero. Considered fashionable and foppish in the best circles and worn by dandies, such as Beau Brummell, they remained the main fashion for men through the 1840s. In the 1850s they were more commonly made in the calf-high version, and in the 1860s they were both superseded by the ankle boot, except for riding. Wellington is one of the two British Prime Ministers to have given his name to an item of clothing, the other being Sir Anthony Eden (see Anthony Eden hat) whilst Sir Winston Churchill gave his name to a cigar, and William Gladstone (four times prime minister between 1868 and 1894) gave his to the Gladstone Bag, the classic doctor's portmanteau.

Modifications
Wellington boots were at first made of leather. However, in 1852 Hiram Hutchinson met Charles Goodyear, who had just invented the sulfur vulcanisation process for natural rubber. Hutchinson bought the patent to manufacture footwear and moved to France to establish À l'Aigle ("At the Eagle") in 1853, to honour his home country. Today the company is simply called Aigle. In a country where 95% of the population were working on fields with wooden clogs as they had been for generations, the introduction of the wholly waterproof, Wellington-type rubber boot became an instant success: farmers would be able to come back home with clean, dry feet.

Production in World War I
Production of the Wellington boot was dramatically boosted with the advent of World War I and a requirement for footwear suitable for the conditions in Europe's flooded and muddy trenches. The North British Rubber Company (now Hunter Boot Ltd) was asked by the War Office to construct a boot suitable for such conditions. The mills ran day and night to produce immense quantities of these trench boots. In total, 1,185,036 pairs were made to meet the British Army's demands.

Production in World War II

In World War II, Hunter Boot was again requested to supply vast quantities of Wellington and thigh boots. 80% of production was of war materials – from (rubber) ground sheets to life belts and gas masks. In the Netherlands, the British forces were working in flooded conditions which demanded Wellingtons and thigh boots in vast supplies.

By the end of the war in 1945, the Wellington had become popular among men, women and children for wet weather wear. The boot had developed to become far roomier with a thick sole and rounded toe. Also, with the rationing of that time, labourers began to use them for daily work.

Post-war

The lower cost and ease of rubber "Wellington" boot manufacture, and being entirely waterproof, lent itself immediately to being the preferred protective material to leather in all forms of industry. Increased attention to occupational health and safety requirements led to the steel toe or steel-capped Wellington: a protective (commonly internal) toe-capping to protect the foot from crush and puncture injuries. Although traditionally made of steel, the reinforcement may be a composite or a plastic material such as thermoplastic polyurethane (TPU). Such steel-toe Wellingtons are nearly indispensable in an enormous range of industry and are often mandatory wear to meet local occupational health and safety legislation or insurance requirements.

In July 1956, the Monopolies and Restrictive Practices Commission published its Report on the Supply of Certain Rubber Footwear, which covered rubber boots of all kinds including wellingtons and overboots. This 107-page official publication addressed contemporary concerns about unfair pricing of rubber footwear manufactured in the UK or imported from overseas. The appendices include lists of rubber footwear manufacturers and price-lists of each company's range of wellington boots available in the mid-1950s.

Green Wellington boots, introduced by Hunter Boot Ltd in 1955, gradually became a shorthand for "country life" in the UK. In 1980, sales of their boots skyrocketed after Lady Diana Spencer (future Princess Diana) was pictured wearing a pair on the Balmoral estate during her courtship with Prince Charles.

Usage and terminology

Australia
Though most commonly called "gumboots", an alternative name, "Blucher Boot", is occasionally used by some older Australians. Blücher was Wellington's colleague at the Battle of Waterloo and there is speculation that some early emigrants to Australia, remembering the battle, may have confused a different design the Blucher shoe developed by Blucher. The Australian poet Henry Lawson wrote a poem to a pair of Blucher Boots in 1890.

North America
While usually called rubber boots, but sometimes galoshes, mud boots, rain boots, mucking boots, or billy boots, in the United States, the terms "gumboots", "wellies", "wellingtons", and "rainboots" are preferred in Canada. Gumboots are popular in Canada during spring, when melting snows leave wet and muddy ground. Young people can be seen wearing them to school or university and taking them to summer camps. They are an essential item for farmers, and many fishermen, often being accompanied by hip waders.

While green is popular in Britain, red-soled black rubber boots are often seen in the United States, in addition to Canadian styles. Rubber boots specifically made for cold weather, lined with warm insulating material, are especially popular practical footwear for Canadian winters. This same style of lined boot is also popular among those who work in or near the ocean as one can wade in and out of shallow, but cold, ocean water, while staying dry and warm.

In the US white mid-calf rubber boots are worn by workers on shrimp boats and construction workers pouring concrete.

Leather boots similar to Wellington's original Hessian boots have been marketed in North America as "Ranch Wellingtons" or "Western Wellingtons". These boots have more rounded toes, lower heels, and less radically scalloped tops than typical "cowboy boots".

New Zealand

In New Zealand, Wellingtons are called "gumboots", "wellies", or "Redbands" (after a popular Skellerup brand) and are considered essential footwear for farmers. Gumboots are often referred to in New Zealand popular culture such as the rurally-based Footrot Flats comic strip. The farming town of Taihape in the North Island proclaims itself "Gumboot capital of the World" and has annual competitions and events such as Gumboot Day, where gumboots are thrown. Most gumboots are black, but those worn by abattoir workers, butchers, fishermen and by hospital operating theatre staff and surgeons are white, and children's sizes come in multiple colours.

The term "gum boot" in New Zealand is thought to derive from the 19th-century kauri-gum diggers, who wore this footwear, or perhaps because the boots were made from gum rubber. The term is often abbreviated to "gummies". New Zealand comedy character Fred Dagg paid tribute to this iconic footwear in his song "Gumboots", a modified version of Billy Connolly's "If It Wisnae Fur Yer Wellies".

Nordic countries
The boots are very popular in Scandinavian countries, with conditions and climate similar to Canada. In fact, before its entry into the mobile phone business, rubber boots were among the best-known products of Nokia. Both the Finnish Defence Forces and the Swedish Armed Forces issue rubber boots to all soldiers for use in wet conditions and during the winter with felt liners.

Russia
In Russia rubber boots were first introduced in the 1920s. Immediately, they became extremely popular because of Russian weather conditions. During the rule of Joseph Stalin, 17 rubber-boot factories were built in different parts of the Soviet Union. Along with valenki in winter, rubber boots became the traditional footwear in springs and autumns.

When Nikita Khrushchev came to power, the boot became charged politically in the context of the "Battle for Modesty" campaign, where rubber footwear was proclaimed as "socialism style" (thus fashionable), while leather, which was obviously more expensive, was derided as "capitalism style" (thus unfashionable). During the period 1961–1964, leather footwear disappeared from Soviet shops. When Leonid Brezhnev came to power in 1964, the usual leather footwear returned to shops, and rubber boots quickly lost their popularity, returning to their original role of utility footwear.

Nowadays, Wellington boots in Russia have the same role as in most countries.

Spain
The most commonly used terms are "botas de pocero" (digger's boots) and "botas de agua" (water boots).

United Kingdom
Wellington boots are a commonly used form of waterproof footwear in the UK and are usually referred to as "wellies".

See also
 British Country Clothing
 Galoshes
 Mackintosh
 Paddington Bear
 Waders (footwear)
 William's Wish Wellingtons

References

External links

Boots
British inventions
Arthur Wellesley, 1st Duke of Wellington
History of fashion
Maritime culture
Caving equipment
19th-century fashion
20th-century fashion
21st-century fashion
History of clothing (Western fashion)